The Niderhorn is a mountain of the Bernese Alps, located north of Zweisimmen in the Bernese Oberland. It lies between the valleys of Simmental and Diemtigen.

References

External links
 Niderhorn on Hikr

Mountains of the Alps
Mountains of Switzerland
Mountains of the canton of Bern
Two-thousanders of Switzerland